Daniel Luiz Flumignan  simply known as Daniel (born 4 June 1981) is a Brazilian retired footballer who played as a goalkeeper. He is the current director of football of São Bernardo Futebol Clube.

Daniel previously played for G.D. Bragança in the Portuguese Second Division, Mixto Esporte Clube, Operário Futebol Clube (Várzea Grande), Ituiutaba Esporte Clube, Boa Esporte Clube in Brazil.

Daniel was the goalkeeper for Ituiutaba, during their championship run in the 2007 Taça Minas Gerais. Following the club's 2007 title, Ituiutaba earned a place in the Copa do Brasil 2008, where Daniel made two appearances.  He also played regularly for Ituiutaba during the 2008 Campeonato Mineiro.

References

External links
 
 
 Profile at CBF.com.br

1981 births
Living people
Brazilian footballers
Footballers from São Paulo
Brazilian expatriate footballers
Campeonato Brasileiro Série B players
Campeonato Brasileiro Série C players
Campeonato Brasileiro Série D players
Associação Portuguesa de Desportos players
Cuiabá Esporte Clube players
Mixto Esporte Clube players
Operário Futebol Clube (Várzea Grande) players
São José Esporte Clube players
Anápolis Futebol Clube players
Associação Atlética Caldense players
GD Bragança players
Boa Esporte Clube players
São Bernardo Futebol Clube players
América Futebol Clube (RN) players
Association football goalkeepers
Nassaji Mazandaran players
Expatriate footballers in Iran
Expatriate footballers in Portugal
Brazilian expatriate sportspeople in Iran
Brazilian expatriate sportspeople in Portugal